The Pink Opaque is a 1986 compilation album by Scottish alternative rock band Cocteau Twins, composed of tracks recorded between 1982 and 1985. A joint release by the UK-based 4AD  and the American Relativity Records, it was their first official U.S. release.

History
After signing to 4AD in 1982, Cocteau Twins released three albums and five EPs between the autumn of 1982 and January 1985. Despite not having American distribution, the band gained popularity there through college radio, particularly with the 1984 single "Pearly Dewdrops' Drops." The American label Relativity Records distributed their albums on license from 4AD. Rather than reissuing all of the band's releases to that point, it was decided that the compilation The Pink Opaque would be issued instead, as a sampler of the Twins' output up through early 1985.

The Pink Opaque is also significant in 4AD's history, as it was the label's first CD release.

Track listing
"The Spangle Maker" (4:40) — from The Spangle Maker (12"), 1984
"Millimillenary" (3:40) — from NME compilation Department of Enjoyment (cassette), 1984
"Wax and Wane" (3:51) — (remixed) from Garlands (album), 1982
"Hitherto" (3:51) — from Sunburst and Snowblind (EP), 1983
"Pearly-Dewdrops' Drops" (4:10) — from Pearly-Dewdrops' Drops (7"), 1984 and The Spangle Maker (12"), 1984
"From the Flagstones" (3:40) — from Sunburst and Snowblind (EP), 1983
"Aikea-Guinea" (3:56) — from Aikea-Guinea (EP), 1985
"Lorelei" (3:42) — from Treasure (album), 1984
"Pepper-Tree" (3:57) — from The Spangle Maker (12"), 1984
"Musette and Drums" (4:36) — from Head Over Heels (album), 1983

Personnel
 Elizabeth Fraser sang and Robin Guthrie played guitar on all tracks. 
 Bass guitar by Will Heggie on track 3; by Guthrie on tracks 4, 6 and 10; and by Simon Raymonde on all other tracks. 
 As on all Cocteau Twins releases, a drum machine was used for percussion. 
 The band were credited as producers on all tracks, except for "Wax and Wane," where Ivo Watts-Russell was credited as co-producer.

References 

Cocteau Twins albums
1986 compilation albums
4AD compilation albums